Morris Mohr (1907 – September 21, 1956) was an American lawyer and politician from New York.

Life
He was born in 1907 in New York City. He attended the public schools. He graduated from Brooklyn Law School in 1934. He married Leah, and they had two children.

In November 1953, Mohr was elected to the New York State Assembly (Bronx County, 3rd District), to fill the vacancy caused by the appointment of Edward T. Galloway as a City Magistrate. Mohr was re-elected in 1954, and remained in the State Assembly until his death in 1956, sitting in the 169th and 170th New York State Legislatures.

He died on September 21, 1956, at his home at 1345 Shakespeare Avenue in the Bronx, after an illness of four months.

State Senator Jerome Schutzer (born 1930) is his son-in-law.

Sources

1907 births
1956 deaths
Democratic Party members of the New York State Assembly
Brooklyn Law School alumni
20th-century American politicians
Politicians from the Bronx